Righteousness is the quality or state of being morally correct and justifiable. It can be considered synonymous with "rightness" or being "upright". It can be found in Indian religions and Abrahamic traditions, among other religions, as a theological concept. For example, from various perspectives in Hinduism, Buddhism, Islam, Christianity, and Judaism it is considered an attribute that implies that a person's actions are justified, and can have the connotation that the person has been "judged" or "reckoned" as leading a life that is pleasing to God.

William Tyndale (Bible translator into English in 1526) remodelled the word after an earlier word rihtwis, which would have yielded modern English *rightwise or *rightways. He used it to translate the Hebrew root צדק tzedek, which appears over five hundred times in the Hebrew Bible, and the Greek word  (dikaios), which appears more than two hundred times in the New Testament.

Etymologically, it comes from
Old English rihtwīs, from riht ‘right’ + wīs ‘manner, state, condition’ (as opposed to wrangwise, "wrongful"). The change in the ending in the 16th century was due to association with words such as bounteous.

Ethics or moral philosophy
Ethics is a major branch of philosophy, encompasses right conduct and good living.
Rushworth Kidder states that "standard definitions of ethics have typically included such phrases as 'the science of the ideal human character' or 'the science of moral duty'". Richard William Paul and Linda Elder define ethics as "a set of concepts and principles that guide us in determining what behavior helps or harms sentient creatures". The Cambridge Dictionary of Philosophy states that the word ethics is "commonly used interchangeably with 'morality' ... and sometimes it is used more narrowly to mean the moral principles of a particular tradition, group or individual".

Abrahamic and Abrahamic-inspired religions

Christianity

In the New Testament, the word righteousness, a translation word for the Greek dikaiosunē, is used as 'being righteous before others' (e.g. Matthew 5:20) or 'being righteous before God' (e.g. Romans 1:17).  William Lane Craig argues that we should think of God as the "paradigm, the locus, the source of all moral value and standards". In Matthew's account of the baptism Jesus tells the prophet "it is fitting for us to fulfill all righteousness" as Jesus requests that John perform the rite for him. The Sermon of the Mount contains the memorable commandment "Seek ye first the kingdom of God and His righteousness".

A secondary meaning of the Greek word is 'justice', which is used to render it in a few places by a few Bible translations, e.g. in Matthew 6:33 in the New English Bible.

Jesus asserts the importance of righteousness by saying in Matthew 5:20, "For I tell you that unless your righteousness surpasses that of the Pharisees and the teachers of the law, you will certainly not enter the kingdom of heaven".

However, Paul the Apostle speaks of two ways, at least in theory, to achieve righteousness: through the Law of Moses (or Torah); and through faith in the atonement made possible through the death and resurrection of Jesus Christ. Some interpret that he repeatedly emphasizes that faith is the only effective way. For example, just a few verses earlier, he states the Jews did not attain the law of righteousness because they sought it not by faith, but by works. The New Testament speaks of a salvation founded on God's righteousness, as exemplified throughout the history of salvation narrated in the Old Testament.
Paul writes to the Romans that righteousness comes by faith: "... a righteousness that is by faith from first to last, just as it is written: 'The righteous will live by faith'".

In  the New Revised Standard Version has a footnote that the original word has the meaning of 'benevolence' and the Messianic Jewish commentary of David Stern affirms the Jewish practice of 'doing tzedakah''' as charity in referring to the Matt. 6 and II Cor. 9 passages.

 speaks of the relationship between works of righteousness and faith, saying that "faith without works is dead". Righteous acts according to James include works of charity as well as avoiding sins against the Law of Moses.

 describes Lot as a righteous man.

Type of saint
In the Eastern Orthodox Church, "Righteous" is a type of saint who is regarded as a holy person under the Old Covenant (Old Testament Israel) but also sometimes used for married saints of the New Covenant (the Church). According to Orthodox theology, the Righteous saints of the Old Covenant were not able to enter into heaven until after the death of Jesus on the cross, but had to await salvation in the Bosom of Abraham (see: Harrowing of Hell).

Islam
Righteousness is mentioned several times in the Quran. The Quran says that a life of righteousness is the only way to go to Heaven.

Judaism

Righteousness is one of the chief attributes of God as portrayed in the Hebrew Bible. Its chief meaning concerns ethical conduct (for example, Leviticus 19:36; Deuteronomy 25:1; Psalm 1:6; Proverbs 8:20). In the Book of Job, the title character is introduced as "a good and righteous man". The Book of Wisdom calls on rulers of the world to embrace righteousness.

Mandaeism

An early self-appellation for Mandaeans is bhiri zidqa meaning 'elect of righteousness' or 'the chosen righteous', a term found in the Book of Enoch and Genesis Apocryphon II, 4. In addition to righteousness, zidqa also refers to alms or almsgiving.Drower, Ethel Stefana. 1937. The Mandaeans of Iraq and Iran. Oxford At The Clarendon Press.

East Asian religions

Yi (Confucianism)Yi,, literally "justice, righteousness, meaning", is an important concept in Confucianism. It involves a moral disposition to do good, and also the intuition and sensibility to do so competently.(Cheng)Yi resonates with Confucian philosophy's orientation towards the cultivation of benevolence (ren) and skillful practice (li).Yi represents moral acumen which goes beyond simple rule following, and involves a balanced understanding of a situation, and the "creative insights" necessary to apply virtues "with no loss of sight of the total good. Yi represents this ideal of totality as well as a decision-generating ability to apply a virtue properly and appropriately in a situation".

In application, yi is a "complex principle" which includes:

 skill in crafting actions which have moral fitness according to a given concrete situation
 the wise recognition of such fitness
 the intrinsic satisfaction that comes from that recognition.

Indian religionsDharma is a key concept with multiple meanings. There might not be a single-word translation for dharma in Western languages. Dharma धर्म can be translated as righteousness, religion, faith, duty, law, and virtue. Connotations of dharma include rightness, good, natural, morality, righteousness, and virtue. It means moral, right, just, balanced, or natural etc. In common parlance, dharma means "right way of living" and "path of rightness". Dharma encompasses ideas such as duty, rights, character, vocation, religion, customs and all behaviour considered appropriate, correct or "morally upright". It is explained as law of righteousness and equated to satya (truth, Sanskrit: satya सत्यं): "... when a man speaks the Truth, they say, "He speaks the Dharma"; and if he speaks Dharma, they say, "He speaks the Truth!" For both are one". — Brihadaranyaka Upanishad, 1.4.xiv. The importance of dharma to Indian sentiments is illustrated by India's decision in 1947 to include the Ashoka Chakra, a depiction of the dharmachakra ( the "wheel of dharma"), as the central motif on its flag.

Hinduism
Bhagavad Gita Chapter 4: Text 7

In Hindu philosophy and religion, major emphasis is placed on individual practical morality. In the Sanskrit epics, this concern is omnipresent. Including duties, rights, laws, conduct, virtues and "right way of living". The Sanskrit epics contain themes and examples where right prevails over wrong, the good over evil.

In the mid-20th century, an inscription of the Indian Emperor Ashoka from the year 258 BC was discovered. This rock inscription contained Sanskrit, Aramaic and Greek text. According to Paul Hacker, on the rock appears a Greek rendering for the Sanskrit word dharma, the word eusebeia. In his 250 BCE Edicts used the word eusebeia as a Greek translation for the central Buddhist and Hindu concept of dharma. This rock inscription, concludes Paul Hacker,[34] suggests dharma in India, about 2300 years ago, was a central concept and meant not only religious ideas, but ideas of right, of good, of one's duty.

The Ramayana is one of the two great Indian epics. The Ramayana tells about life in India around 1000 BCE and offers models in dharma. The hero, Rama, lived his whole life by the rules of dharma; in fact, that was why Indian consider him heroic. When Rama was a young boy, he was the perfect son. Later he was an ideal husband to his faithful wife, Sita, and a responsible ruler of Aydohya. Each episode of Ramayana presents life situations and ethical questions in symbolic terms. The issue is debated by the characters, finally the right prevails over wrong, the good over evil. For this reason, in Hindu Epics, the good, morally upright, law-abiding king is referred to as "dharmaraja".

In Mahabharata, the other major Indian epic, similarly, dharma is central, and it is presented with symbolism and metaphors. Near the end of the epic, the god Yama, referred to as dharma in the text, is portrayed as taking the form of a dog to test the compassion of Yudhishthira, who is told he may not enter paradise with such an animal, but refuses to abandon his companion, for which decision he is then praised by dharma. The value and appeal of the Mahabharata is not as much in its complex and rushed presentation of metaphysics in the 12th book, claims Ingalls, because Indian metaphysics is more eloquently presented in other Sanskrit scriptures; the appeal of Mahabharata, like Ramayana, is in its presentation of a series of moral problems and life situations, to which there are usually three answers given, according to Ingalls: one answer is of Bhima, which is the answer of brute force, an individual angle representing materialism, egoism, and self; the second answer is of Yudhishthira, which is always an appeal to piety and gods, of social virtue and of tradition; the third answer is of introspective Arjuna, which falls between the two extremes, and who, claims Ingalls, symbolically reveals the finest moral qualities of man. The Epics of Hinduism are a symbolic treatise about life, virtues, customs, morals, ethics, law, and other aspects of dharma. There is extensive discussion of dharma at the individual level in the Epics of Hinduism, observes Ingalls; for example, on free will versus destiny, when and why human beings believe in either, ultimately concluding that the strong and prosperous naturally uphold free will, while those facing grief or frustration naturally lean towards destiny. The Epics of Hinduism illustrate various aspects of dharma, they are a means of communicating dharma with metaphors.

In Hinduism, dharma signifies behaviors that are considered to be in accord with Ṛta, the order that makes life and universe possible, and includes duties, rights, laws, conduct, virtues and "right way of living". The concept of dharma was already in use in the historical Vedic religion, and its meaning and conceptual scope has evolved over several millennia. The ancient Tamil moral text of Tirukkural is solely based on aṟam, the Tamil term for dharma. The antonym of dharma is adharma.

 Buddhism 
In Buddhism dharma means cosmic law and order, but is also applied to the teachings of the Buddha. In Buddhist philosophy, dhamma/dharma is also the term for "phenomena". Dharma refers not only to the sayings of the Buddha, but also to the later traditions of interpretation and addition that the various schools of Buddhism have developed to help explain and to expand upon the Buddha's teachings. For others still, they see the Dharma as referring to the "truth", or the ultimate reality of "the way that things really are".

Jainism
Tattvartha Sutra mentions Das-dharma with the meaning of "righteous". These are forbearance, modesty, straightforwardness, purity, truthfulness, self-restraint, austerity, renunciation, non-attachment, and celibacy.

A right believer should constantly meditate on virtues of dharma, like supreme modesty, in order to protect the soul from all contrary dispositions. He should also cover up the shortcomings of others.

— Puruṣārthasiddhyupāya (27)

Sikhism
For Sikhs, the word Dharm means the path of righteousness and proper religious practice. For Sikhs, the word dharam (Punjabi: ਧਰਮ, romanized: dharam'') means the path of righteousness and proper religious practice. Guru Granth Sahib in hymn 1353 connotes dharma as duty. The 3HO movement in Western culture, which has incorporated certain Sikh beliefs, defines Sikh Dharma broadly as all that constitutes religion, moral duty and way of life.

Persian religions

Zoroastrianism
In Zoroastrianism, Asha is a very important tenet of the Zoroastrian religion with a complex and highly nuanced range of meaning. It is commonly summarized in accord with its contextual implications of 'truth' and 'right(eousness)', 'order' and 'right working'.

From an early age, Zoroastrians are taught to pursue Righteousness in their everyday lives by following the Threefold Path of Asha: Humata, Huxta, Huvarshta (Good Thoughts, Good Words, Good Deeds).

One of the most sacred and powerful mantras in the religion is the Ashem Vohu, after the Ahunavar or Ahuna Vairya, which has been translated as an Ode to Righteousness. There are many translations that all differ due to the complexity of Avestan and the concepts involved (for other translations, see: Ashem Vohu).

"Righteousness is the best good and it is happiness.
Happiness is to her/him who is righteous,
for the sake of the best righteousness".

See also
 Alien righteousness
 Asha
 Biblical law in Christianity
 Christian perfection
 Expounding of the Law
 Imparted righteousness
 Imputed righteousness
 Justice, the ideal, morally correct state of things and persons.
 Justification
 Pono for righteousness in Hawaiian culture.
 Proper righteousness
 Rashidun Mahdi for the Islamic concept of righteousness.
 Righteous Among the Nations
 Sacred
 Salvation
 Sanctification
 Zidqa

References

External links
 
 

Attributes of God in Christian theology
Religious ethics
Concepts in ethics
Good and evil
Virtue